Robert Johnson (born February 13, 1987) is a former American football safety. He was drafted by the Titans in the fifth round of the 2010 NFL Draft. He played college football at Utah.

Professional career

Tennessee Titans
On July 27, 2010, Johnson signed his rookie contract with the Tennessee Titans. On August 11, 2013, Johnson was waived by the Titans.

References

External links
Utah Utes bio
Tennessee Titans bio

1987 births
Living people
American football safeties
Utah Utes football players
Tennessee Titans players